"Knock Three Times"
is a popular song credited simply to "Dawn". Tony Orlando was not named on the record. The actual singers were Tony Orlando, Toni Wine, and Linda November, prior to the creation of "Dawn" with Telma Hopkins and Joyce Vincent Wilson. The song was released as a single, which hit No. 1 on the Billboard Hot 100 in January 1971 and eventually sold six million copies. The song registered well at Adult Contemporary stations, reaching No. 2 on 'Billboards "Easy Listening" survey.  Outside the US, "Knock Three Times" also claimed the No. 1 spot on the UK Singles Chart.

The composers of this song, L. Russell Brown and Irwin Levine, were thinking of the song "Up on the Roof" and they wanted to write a song with that kind of lyrical flavor, about tenement living. In the song, the singer has fallen in love with a woman who lives in the apartment directly below his but has no clue as to her interest, so he asks her to respond by either knocking three times on the ceiling (yes) or banging twice on the pipe (no), and the chorus includes sound effects of the two choices.

Orlando was, at the time of the recording, working as a producer/singer for a rival record label, and first heard the tune recorded by another artist and immediately knew the song could be a hit if produced as he envisioned.  Orlando cut the track discreetly under the name "Dawn", hoping that his current record label would not find out.  Upon release, the song became a great success.

"Knock Three Times" appears in several motion pictures including Now and Then.

The song was covered by Billy "Crash" Craddock in 1971 and became a No. 3 country hit.

Several Larry Craig-themed parodies (all titled "Tap Three Times") were recorded by various artists such as Paul and Storm and the Capitol Steps in 2007 following the senator's sex scandal in which he was arrested for tapping his foot (to allegedly solicit sex) in a public airport restroom.

Chart performance

Weekly charts

Year-end charts

All-time charts

References

1970 singles
1971 singles
Tony Orlando songs
Billy "Crash" Craddock songs
Billboard Hot 100 number-one singles
Cashbox number-one singles
UK Singles Chart number-one singles
Number-one singles in Australia
RPM Top Singles number-one singles
Number-one singles in New Zealand
Number-one singles in South Africa
Songs written by L. Russell Brown
Songs written by Irwin Levine
Bell Records singles
1970 songs